10 Draconis is a single star in the northern circumpolar constellation of Draco. It was a latter designation of 87 Ursae Majoris, and is visible to the naked eye with an apparent visual magnitude of 4.66. It is moving closer with a heliocentric radial velocity of −12 km/s, and is expected to come to within  in about 8.6 million years.

Estimated to be around 10 billion years old, this is an aging red giant star with a stellar classification of M3.5 III. It is a periodic variable with a frequency of 11.98912 cycles per day and an amplitude of 0.0254 in magnitude. The spectrum does not show evidence of s-process enhancement. 10 Dra has 93% of the mass of the Sun but has expanded to about 83 times the Sun's radius. The star is radiating over 1,000 times the Sun's luminosity from its enlarged photosphere at an effective temperature of 3,584 K.

References

M-type giants
Slow irregular variables
Draco (constellation)
Draconis, i
Durchmusterung objects
Draconis, 10
121130
067627
5226
Draconis, CU